Fabiana Masili (Rio Claro) is a Brazilian singer and songwriter. Musical from her earliest years, she started playing the organ at the age of 8 and began working professionally and singing in bands at 15.

Fabiana Masili studied at the prestigious State University of Campinas – UNICAMP, in Brazil, earning her bachelor's degree in Popular Music while singing in several bands and producing at a Brazilian recording studio, Fabrica do Som.

Afterwards she started a meteoric international career singing in São Miguel Island (Portugal), in Berkeley (United States) and, finally, in New York City (United States). Throughout her career, Fabiana Masili has also participated in several Album recordings.

Awards 
Masili's singing has earned her prominent awards in Brazil such as "Best Jingle (2000)" and "Best Soundtrack for TV (2001) with Cicero Fornari, Gustavo Souza and Eric dos Santos".

International career 
Fabiana started her international career in 2000, after spending 6 months singing in São Miguel Island, the largest and most populous island in the Portuguese archipelago of the Azores.

In 2001 she moved to the United States to study at the Jazzschool in Berkeley, CA. Her road to bigger fame came in around 2003, when she moved to New York City. After that, she has worked with names such as Claudio Roditi, Cidinho Teixeira, Dom Salvador, Frank Martin, Ledisi, Slide Hampton, Jeremy Pelt, Davi Vieira, Sandro Albert, Nation Beat, Dario Boente, Itaiguara Brandão, Mauricio Zottarelli, Scott Kettner.

With regular performances at Lincoln Center Outdoors, Dizzy's Coca-Cola, Rockwood MusicHall, Summerstage, The Zinc Bar, Cafe Wha?, Drom, Joe's Pub, Nublu and S.O.B.'s, With her outgoing personality and unique stage presence, she instantly became a big hit and made her mark among the greatest performers in the city.

Present 

She is currently working on her first album featuring Davi Viera and her band Jabacule. It will comprise many Brazilian funk numbers and her expertise in Brazilian Jazz numbers.
Masili is at her peak form with regular appearances for the Brazooka at the world-famous, "Café Wha?" the Zinc Bar and S.O.B.'s.

She also performed at the Brazil Premiere 2009 at the Museum of Modern Art, New York, with Davi Vieira.

On 3 May 2013 was released the Love Science Music Album, by Josh Giunta, which counts with the participation of Fabiana Masili on the vocals.

Selected discography 

2003  "Nunca Desista" – Cicero Fornari – Bebê com Lobo

2008  "Vai Tristeza" – Duke Mushroom – Bahia 2 Harlem, vol1

2010  "Game Over" – Dário Boente & Huge in Japan – Sambatronic

2010  "Sorte" – Dário Boente & Huge in Japan – Sambatronic

2010  "My life has Value" – Dário Boente & Huge in Japan – Sambatronic

2010  "Bahia" – Dário Boente & Huge in Japan – Sambatronic

2013  "Simplify" – Josh Giunta – Love Science Music

2014  "Rastros" – Jeremy Pelt – Face Forward, Jeremy

References

External links 
Qui nem Jiló – Zinc Bar
Amor até o fim – Zinc Bar
Água de lua- Zinc Bar
Swing Bahia – Celebrate Brooklyn
Sorte – DARIO BOENTE & HUGE IN JAPAN
Na rua na chuva na fazenda – Brazil Live
My life has value – Huge in Japan
My life has value – Huge in Japan (2)
Dario Boente Website – Videoclips
Cidinho Teixeira & Friends at Zinc Bar
Davi Vieira – Joe's Pub
Cidinho Teixeira & Fabiana Masili – Zinc Bar
SUMMER JAZZ CAFE – WEEKEND IN BRAZIL W/ FABIANA MASILI

NATION BEAT

Lincoln Center Outdoors – Tale of two Nations – Nation Beat + Estrela Brilhante 2013

Lincoln Center Atrium – Golden Crown 2014

Baque Retroativo (Nation Beat) Bethesda Blues and Jazz Supperclub 2014

WOMEN IN NEW ORLEANS MARDI GRAS INDIAN MUSIC – INTERVIEW WITH SPYBOY HONEY BANISTER

Nation Beat & Cha Wa – Carnaval Caravan 02/2015 

TD Sunfest Canada with Nation Beat & Cha Wa – 2015

Nation Beat – Nago Nago @ DROM 2015

Dizzy's Coca-Cola – Brazilian Voyage with Nilson Matta 2015

MARACATU NY
Halloween Parade 2014

Halloween Parade 2015

Halloween Parade 2016

Halloween Parade 2017

Living people
1978 births
Brazilian singer-songwriters
21st-century Brazilian singers
21st-century Brazilian women singers
Brazilian women singer-songwriters